Miguel Sánchez-Migallón Naranjo (born 8 February 1995) is a Spanish handball player for Industria Kielce and the Spanish national team.

References

External links

1995 births
Living people
People from Ciudad Real
Spanish male handball players
Liga ASOBAL players
Medalists at the 2020 Summer Olympics
Olympic bronze medalists for Spain
Olympic medalists in handball
Handball players at the 2020 Summer Olympics
Olympic handball players of Spain
Vive Kielce players
Sportspeople from the Province of Ciudad Real
Expatriate handball players in Poland
Spanish expatriate sportspeople in Poland
21st-century Spanish people